The 2015 FIFA Women's World Cup qualification UEFA Group 4 was a UEFA qualifying group for the 2015 FIFA Women's World Cup. The group comprised Bosnia and Herzegovina, Faroe Islands, Northern Ireland, Poland, Scotland and Sweden.

The group winners qualified directly for the 2015 FIFA Women's World Cup. Among the seven group runners-up, the four best (determined by records against the first-, third-, fourth- and fifth-placed teams only for balance between different groups) advanced to the play-offs.

Standings

Results
All times are CEST (UTC+02:00) during summer and CET (UTC+01:00) during winter.

Goalscorers
13 goals
 Jane Ross

12 goals
 Lotta Schelin

6 goals
 Kosovare Asllani

5 goals
 Ewa Pajor

4 goals

 Rachel Corsie
 Kim Little
 Lina Nilsson

3 goals

 Patrycja Pożerska
 Jen Beattie
 Lisa Evans
 Leanne Ross
 Emma Lundh
 Caroline Seger

2 goals

 Heidi Sevdal
 Rachel Furness
 Patrycja Balcerzak
 Natalia Pakulska
 Agnieszka Winczo
 Patrycja Wiśniewska
 Leanne Crichton
 Suzanne Lappin

1 goal

 Eldina Ahmić
 Melisa Hasanbegović
 Lidija Kuliš
 Monika Kuliš
 Milena Nikolić
 Alisa Spahić
 Eyðvør Klakstein
 Natalia Pakulska
 Aleksandra Sikora
 Jolanta Siwińska
 Magdalena Szaj
 Joanne Love
 Suzanne Malone
 Caroline Weir
 Jenny Hjohlman
 Amanda Ilestedt
 Olivia Schough
 Caroline Seger
 Linda Sembrant
 Therese Sjögran

1 own goal
 Elsa Jacobsen (playing against Northern Ireland)
 Marta Mika (playing against Bosnia & Herzegovina)

References

External links
Women's World Cup – Qualifying round Group 4, UEFA.com

Group 4
2013 in Swedish women's football
2014 in Swedish women's football
2013–14 in Bosnia and Herzegovina football
2014–15 in Bosnia and Herzegovina football
2013 in Faroe Islands football
2014 in Faroe Islands football
2013–14 in Northern Ireland association football
2014–15 in Northern Ireland association football
2013–14 in Polish football
2014–15 in Polish football
2013 in Scottish women's football
2014 in Scottish women's football
Qual